Nuclear factor 1 C-type is a protein that in humans is encoded by the NFIC gene.

References

Further reading

External links 
 

Transcription factors